The Kindly Ones may refer to:

 The Kindly Ones,  a euphemistic reference to the Furies in Greek mythology
 The Kindly Ones (Littell novel), a 2006 translation of French novel Les Bienveillantes by Jonathan Littell
 The Kindly Ones (Powell novel), a 1962 novel by Anthony Powell, sixth in the novel sequence A Dance to the Music of Time
 The Sandman: The Kindly Ones, a 1996 volume of The Sandman comic book series by Neil Gaiman
 The Kindly Ones, a 1987 science fiction novel by Melissa Scott